The Sixth Doctor is an incarnation of the Doctor, the protagonist of the BBC science fiction television series Doctor Who. He is portrayed by Colin Baker. Although his televisual time on the series was comparatively brief and turbulent, Baker has continued as the Sixth Doctor in Big Finish's range of original Doctor Who audio adventures. 

Within the series' narrative, the Doctor is a centuries-old alien Time Lord from the planet Gallifrey who travels in time and space in the TARDIS, frequently with companions. At the end of life, the Doctor regenerates; as a result, the physical appearance and personality of the Doctor changes. Baker portrays the sixth such incarnation: an arrogant and flamboyant character in brightly coloured, mismatched clothes whose brash and often patronising personality set him apart from all his previous incarnations.

The Sixth Doctor appeared in three seasons. His appearance in the first of these was at the end of the final episode of The Caves of Androzani which featured the regeneration from the Fifth Doctor and thereafter in the following serial The Twin Dilemma, the end of that season. The Sixth Doctor's era was marked by the decision of the BBC controller Michael Grade to put the series on an 18-month "hiatus" between seasons 22 and 23, with only one new Doctor Who story, Slipback, made on radio during the hiatus, broadcast as 6 parts (at 10 minutes each) on BBC Radio 4 from 25 July to 8 August 1985, as part of a children's magazine show called Pirate Radio Four. Colin Baker had been signed up for four years, as the previous actor Peter Davison had left after only three years. Due to his decidedly short screen time, the Sixth Doctor appeared with only two companions, most notably the American college student Peri Brown (Nicola Bryant), who had travelled with his previous incarnation, before being briefly joined by Mel Bush (Bonnie Langford), a computer technician from his future he had yet to actually meet during his trial.

Prior to its postponement, season 23 was well advanced with episodes already drafted and in at least one case distributed to cast and production. Alongside "The Nightmare Fair", "The Ultimate Evil", "Mission to Magnus", "Yellow Fever and How to Cure It", the remaining stories were still under development in a 25-minute episode format after the season was postponed. These were all dropped with the reconception of the season in mid 1985 in favour of the 14-episode story arc The Trial of a Time Lord. The Sixth Doctor also appeared in the special Dimensions in Time. There are also novels and audio plays featuring the Sixth Doctor, and the character has been visually referenced several times in the revived 2000s production of the show.

More so than any other canonical incarnation, aside from the Eighth Doctor, the Sixth Doctor has been heavily expanded upon in expanded universe media, most notably in audio stories produced by Big Finish Productions. In The Marian Conspiracy (2000), a new companion was introduced - Dr. Evelyn Smythe, a middle-aged history lecturer on the verge of compulsory retirement whose sharp tongue and unwillingness to tolerate the Doctor's attitude steadily taught him to rein in his more unkind tendencies. Due to this influence, the Sixth Doctor evolved into a more compassionate and likable character. In addition, beginning with the webcast Real Time (2003), his costume was revised into a monochromatic blue variant, displayed on many audio stories' covers since then.

Biography
The Sixth Doctor's regeneration was initially unstable, and he nearly strangled Peri before he came to his senses. Realising what he had nearly done, he initially considered going into a hermit-like existence on the planet Titan 3, only to be caught up in events on the planet Jocanda, after which he resumed his travels (The Twin Dilemma). He encountered many old foes including the Master, Daleks, Cybermen and Sontarans, and even shared an adventure with his own second incarnation in The Two Doctors. He also faced a renegade female Time Lord scientist, the Rani, who was conducting experiments on humans using the Luddite riots as a cover.

Later, the Doctor and Peri landed on the devastated planet Ravolox, which they discovered was actually Earth, moved across space with devastating consequences. Before they could discover the reason for this disaster, the TARDIS landed on Thoros Beta. What actually happened here is unclear, but initial accounts suggest that Peri was killed after being cruelly used as a test subject in brain transplant experiments and the Doctor was pulled out of time to a Time Lord space station where he was put on trial for the second time by his own race, the Time Lords.  In reality the trial was a cover-up organised by the High Council. A race from Andromeda had stolen Time Lord secrets and hidden on Earth, so to protect themselves the Time Lords had moved Earth through space, burning the surface in a massive fireball and leaving it as Ravolox. The prosecutor at that trial, the Valeyard, turned out to be a possible future evil incarnation of the Doctor himself who was out to steal his remaining lives. He had also edited the Matrix recordings of the Doctor's travels; in reality Peri had survived events on Thoros Beta. The events of the trial tangled the Doctor's timeline slightly, as he left in the company of Mel, whom he technically had not yet met.

When the TARDIS is attacked by the Rani, the Sixth Doctor was somehow injured and regenerated into the Seventh Doctor; the exact cause of the regeneration, however, has never been revealed on-screen.

An aged Sixth Doctor appeared as one of the “Guardians of the Edge” in an afterlife, inside the Doctor’s mind in the final Thirteenth Doctor special, "The Power of the Doctor."

Beyond the trial and before the regeneration in spin-off media
Doctor Who was put on hiatus for 18 months following The Trial of a Time Lord, and Colin Baker was asked to return for a single story which would have led to an event precipitating the Doctor's regeneration.  As he declined to do so, there were limits as to what could be done on screen for the purposes of transitioning to a new Doctor when the series resumed with Time and the Rani and there were other unresolved questions, such as when and how the Doctor and Mel actually met.  Attempts have been made by various authors to fill in these narrative gaps.

The Virgin Missing Adventures novel Time of Your Life states that the Doctor went into a self-imposed exile to avoid becoming the Valeyard. He was lured back into travelling by the Time Lords, and recruited Grant Markham as a companion. Although now travelling again, he attempted to avoid meeting Mel and recruited other companions, with the audios depicting a range of companions including history lecturer Evelyn Smythe, "Edwardian adventuress" Charley Pollard (a former companion of the Eighth Doctor who is rescued by the Sixth as part of a temporal paradox), supermarket check-out girl Flip Jackson, and WREN code-breaker Constance Clarke. The novel The Shadow in the Glass also depicts the Doctor working with his old friend Brigadier Lethbridge-Stewart to thwart a conspiracy to unleash a Fourth Reich led by the secret son of Adolf Hitler. The Doctor eventually encounters Mel accidentally during the events of the BBC Books novel Business Unusual and accepts his fate once she stows away in the TARDIS.

Pip and Jane Baker's novelisation of Time and the Rani provides the first relatively brief attempt to explain the Doctor's regeneration (specifically, that it was triggered by "tumultuous buffeting" as the Rani attacked the TARDIS). The Virgin New Adventures series suggests that the Seventh Doctor somehow deliberately killed the Sixth, because he could not become the masterplanner and manipulator that his next incarnation became, due to his fear of becoming the Valeyard. The BBC Books Past Doctor Adventures novel Spiral Scratch proposes that the Sixth Doctor died as a result of his chronal energy being drained in a confrontation with a powerful pan-dimensional entity before being snared by the Rani's beam.  The unofficial, for-charity-published, novel Time's Champion by Craig Hinton and Chris McKeon consigns the events of Spiral Scratch to an alternate timeline, and makes the Sixth Doctor the eponymous Time's Champion, to save Mel from the clutches of the Time Lord God, Death. In these events, the Doctor, through the TARDIS' telepathic circuits, forces his own regeneration and then travels towards Lakertya, setting up the events of Time and the Rani.

In 2015, Big Finish Productions released The Sixth Doctor: The Last Adventure, an audio drama depicting the events leading up to the Sixth Doctor's death and regeneration. According to this account, after a series of encounters with the Valeyard over the course of his life depicting the Valeyard regaining his energy after their last battle, the Sixth Doctor is essentially 'replaced' by the Valeyard, who had planted parasitic creatures in the TARDIS's telepathic circuits that formed a link with the Doctor over the course of his life, trapping the last fragments of the Doctor's personality in the Matrix. Faced with the prospect that the Valeyard, who has already replaced the Doctor's timeline so that even Mel believes he has always been the Doctor, will go on to do the same thing to every other Time Lord in history, the Sixth Doctor sends a message from the Matrix to his own past self, diverting the younger Doctor to travel to the planet Lakertya shortly before the Valeyard originally took over his timeline. As a result, the younger Doctor is exposed to radiation that is deadly to Time Lords, with his death and subsequent regeneration into the Seventh Doctor killing the parasites, stopping the Valeyard from succeeding with his plan as the regeneration 'kills' the link the parasites had created to the Doctor, but also setting up the events of Time and the Rani.

Costume
Colin Baker wished to dress his Doctor in black velvet, to reflect his character's darker personality. Producer John Nathan-Turner, however, opted for a deliberately "totally tasteless" costume with clashing colours. Designer Pat Godfrey made several attempts which were considered not tasteless enough before Nathan-Turner finally accepted the last one as sufficiently garish. Colin Baker later described the outfit as "an explosion in a rainbow factory".

The Sixth Doctor wears a scarlet plaid frock coat, with green patchwork, and yellow and pink lapels over a white shirt with crimson question marks embroidered in the collar (a feature of the programme since 1980), a waistcoat with a fob watch, a large tie, yellow trousers with black stripes, and emerald green ankle boots with royal orange spats.  There were many variants on the waistcoat and tie, the earliest being the knitted brown waistcoat and turquoise cravat. The waistcoat was  changed to burgundy check, and in the following story a new crimson cravat with cream polka dots appeared. The "future" version of the Sixth Doctor seen aboard the Hyperion III (The Trial of a Time Lord) wore a stripey waistcoat and a yellow cravat, speckled with black stars.  Baker added a cat badge to the ensemble. During Baker's run in the stage play Doctor Who – The Ultimate Adventure, the original frock coat was replaced by a similar one with a scarlet, blue and purple colour scheme.

More recently, a royal blue version of the original costume has been used in spin-off media. First used in the webcast Real Time, due to the limited availability of colours in the type of animation used, it has appeared subsequently on covers of audio dramas from Big Finish Productions. In the Big Finish audio Criss-Cross, the Doctor is depicted on the cover as wearing a brown-and-scarlet tweed jacket and waistcoat with a blue-and-white striped shirt, along with a navy blue bow tie with crimson spots, while acting undercover in Bletchley Park in 1944 after the TARDIS is rendered inoperable by a strange signal. The Doctor dons this attire again, referring to it as his 'Bletchley Tweeds', when visiting Russia in 1947 in the audio Quicksilver.

Other appearances
 The Sixth Doctor's image appears among other incarnations in the revival series episodes "The Next Doctor" (2008) and "The Eleventh Hour" (2010). He also appears in "The Day of the Doctor" (2013) using archived footage as well as "The Power Of The Doctor" (2022) as a fragment of The Doctor, alongside previous doctors, although aged.
"A Fix with Sontarans", a segment of the children's television programme Jim'll Fix It.
 In Top Gear (Season 2, Episode 8), the Sixth Doctor's TARDIS appears on the test track, distracting a Cyberman trying to set a lap time in a Honda Civic. The Doctor sets a lap time of 1:43.

Webcasts
 Real Time

Novels
Target Books Missing Episodes
 The Nightmare Fair by Graham Williams
 The Ultimate Evil by Wally K. Daly
 Mission to Magnus by Philip Martin

Virgin New Adventures
 Head Games by Steve Lyons (Manifestation of the Sixth Doctor's persona attacks the Seventh Doctor)

Virgin Missing Adventures
 State of Change by Christopher Bulis (temporal disruptions in the pocket dimension the TARDIS arrives in cause the Doctor to regress through his previous five bodies, and he spends some time allowing the persona of the Third Doctor to take control)
 Time of Your Life by Steve Lyons
 Millennial Rites by Craig Hinton (dimensional instabilities cause the Doctor to briefly transform into the Valeyard)
 Killing Ground by Steve Lyons
 Burning Heart by Dave Stone

Past Doctor Adventures
 Business Unusual by Gary Russell
 Mission: Impractical by David A. McIntee
 Players by Terrance Dicks (Also features a flashback to the Second Doctor)
 Grave Matter by Justin Richards
 The Quantum Archangel by Craig Hinton (Also features a brief appearance by an alternate version of the Third Doctor)
 The Shadow in the Glass by Justin Richards and Stephen Cole
 Instruments of Darkness by Gary Russell
 Palace of the Red Sun by Christopher Bulis
 Blue Box by Kate Orman
 Synthespians™ by Craig Hinton
 Spiral Scratch by Gary Russell (Ends in the Sixth Doctor's regeneration)

Eighth Doctor Adventures
 The Eight Doctors by Terrance Dicks
 Seen in the TARDIS mirror in Camera Obscura

Make Your Own Adventure
 Search for the Doctor by Dave Martin
 Crisis in Space by Michael Holt

Time's Champion
In 2008, an unofficial Doctor Who novel Time's Champion was published, written by Chris McKeon and the late Craig Hinton. All proceeds went to the British Heart Foundation.

Telos Doctor Who novellas
 Shell Shock by Simon A Forward

Short stories
 "Brief Encounter: A Wee Deoch an..?" by Colin Baker (Doctor Who Magazine Winter Special 1991)
Penguin Fiftieth Anniversary eBook novellas
 Something Borrowed by Richelle Mead

Comics

The Sixth Doctor was featured in a number of acclaimed comic strips drawn by John Ridgway. These featured visuals and storylines of a whimsical fantasy nature, similar to Alice in Wonderland. The Sixth Doctor was somewhat calmer and more restrained than on television. All of these comic strips appeared in Doctor Who magazine in the 1980s. Colin Baker himself wrote a comic book special called The Age of Chaos in which the Sixth Doctor and Frobisher visit an older version of Peri.

Doctor Who Magazine
 The Shape-Shifter
 Voyager
 Polly the Glot
 Once upon a Time Lord
 War-Game
 Fun-House
 Kane's Story / Abel's Story / Warriors' Story / Frobisher's Story
 Exodus / Revelation / Genesis
 Nature of the Beast
 Time Bomb
 Salad Daze
 Changes
 Profit of Doom
 The Gift
 The World Shapers
 Emperor of the Daleks
 Up Above the Gods

Classic Comic Special
 The Age of Chaos

IDW Comics
 The Forgotten
 Prisoners of Time

Video games
 Doctor Who and the Mines of Terror
 Destiny of the Doctors
 Lego Dimensions

Audio dramas
 Sixth Doctor audio plays
 Gallifrey: Disassembled (Alternate Sixth Doctor)
The Sirens of Time (An Adventure related by the Character the 6th Doctor) (1999)
Whispers of Terror (An Adventure related by the Characters the 6th Doctor & Peri Brown) (1999)
The Marian Conspiracy (An Adventure related by the Characters the 6th Doctor & Evelyn Smythe) (2000)
The Spectre of Lanyon Moor (An Adventure related by the Characters the 6th Doctor, Evelyn & Brigadier Lethbridge-Stewart) (2000)
The Apocalypse Element (An Adventure related by the Characters the 6th Doctor, Evelyn & Romana II) (2000)
The Holy Terror (An Adventure related by the Characters the 6th Doctor & Frobisher) (2000)
Bloodtide (An Adventure related by the Characters the 6th Doctor & Evelyn) (2001)
Project: Twilight (An Adventure related by the Characters the 6th Doctor & Evelyn) (2001)
The One Doctor (An Adventure related by the Characters the 6th Doctor & Mel Bush) (2001)
Excelis Rising (An Adventure related by the Character the 6th Doctor) (2002)
...Ish (An Adventure related by the Characters the 6th Doctor & Peri) (2002)
The Sandman (An Adventure related by the Characters the 6th Doctor & Evelyn) (2002)
The Maltese Penguin (An Adventure related by the Characters the 6th Doctor & Frobisher) (2002)
Jubilee (An Adventure related by the Characters the 6th Doctor & Evelyn) (2003)
Doctor Who and the Pirates (An Adventure related by the Characters the 6th Doctor & Evelyn) (2003)
Project: Lazarus (An Adventure related by the Characters the 6th Doctor & Evelyn) (2003)
Davros (An Adventure related by the Character the 6th Doctor) (2003)
Zagerus (An Adventure related by the Character the 6th Doctor) (2003)
The Wormery (An Adventure related by the Character the 6th Doctor) (2003)
Arrangements For War (An Adventure related by the Characters the 6th Doctor & Evelyn) (2004)
Medicinal Purposes (An Adventure related by the Characters the 6th Doctor & Evelyn) (2004)
Her Final Flight (An Adventure related by the Characters the 6th Doctor & Peri) (2004)
The Juggernauts (An Adventure related by the Characters the 6th Doctor & Mel) (2005)
Catch 1782 (An Adventure related by the Characters the 6th Doctor & Mel) (2005)
Thicker Than Water (An Adventure related by the Characters the 6th Doctor, Evelyn & Mel) (2005)
Pier Pressure (An Adventure related by the Characters the 6th Doctor & Mel) (2006)
The Nowhere Place (An Adventure related by the Characters the 6th Doctor & Evelyn) (2006)
The Reaping (An Adventure related by the Characters the 6th Doctor & Peri) (2006)
Year of the Pig (An Adventure related by the Characters the 6th Doctor & Peri) (2006)
I.D & Urgent Calls (An Adventure related by the Character the 6th Doctor) (2007)
The Wishing Beast (An Adventure related by the Characters the 6th Doctor & Mel) (2007)
100 (An Adventure related by the Characters the 6th Doctor & Evelyn) (2007)
The Condemned (An Adventure related by the Characters the 6th Doctor &  Charley Pollard) (2008)
Assassins in the Limelight (An Adventure related by the Characters the 6th Doctor & Evelyn) (2008)
The Doomwood Curse (An Adventure related by the Characters the 6th Doctor & Charley) (2008)
Brotherhood of the Daleks (An Adventure related by the Characters the 6th Doctor & Charley) (2008)
The Raincloud Man (An Adventure related by the Characters the 6th Doctor & Charley) (2008)
Patient Zero (An Adventure related by the Characters the 6th Doctor & Charley) (2009)
Paper Cuts (An Adventure related by the Characters the 6th Doctor & Charley) (2009)
Blue Forgotten Planet (An Adventure related by the Characters the 6th Doctor & Charley) (2009)
The Nightmare Fair (An Adventure related by the Characters the 6th Doctor & Peri) (2009)
Return of the Krotons (An Adventure related by the Characters the 6th Doctor & Charley) (2009)
Mission To Magnus (An Adventure related by the Characters the 6th Doctor & Peri) (2009)
Levithan (An Adventure related by the Characters the 6th Doctor & Peri) (2010)
The Hollows of Time (An Adventure related by the Characters the 6th Doctor & Peri) (2010)
Paradise 5 (An Adventure related by the Characters the 6th Doctor & Peri) (2010)
Point of Entry (An Adventure related by the Characters the 6th Doctor & Peri) (2010)
City of Spires (An Adventure related by the Characters the 6th Doctor & Jamie McCrimmon) (2010)
Night's Black Agents (An Adventure related by the Character Jamie) (2010)
The Song of Megaptera (An Adventure related by the Characters the 6th Doctor & Peri) (2010)
The Wreck of the Titan (An Adventure related by the Characters the 6th Doctor & Jamie) (2010)
The Macros (An Adventure related by the Characters the 6th Doctor & Peri) (2010)
Legend of the Cybermen (An Adventure related by the Characters the 6th Doctor, Jamie & Zoe Herriot) (2010)
A Town Called Fortune (An Adventure related by the Character Evelyn) (2010)
The Four Doctors (An Adventure related by the Character the 6th Doctor) (2010)
Peri and the Piscon Paradox (An Adventure related by the Characters the 6th Doctor & Peri) (2011)
The Crimes of Thomas Brewster (An Adventure related by the Characters the 6th Doctor, Evelyn & Thomas Brewster) (2011)
The Feast of Axos (An Adventure related by the Characters the 6th Doctor, Evelyn & Brewster) (2011)
Industrial Evolution (An Adventure related by the Characters the 6th Doctor, Evelyn & Brewste) (2011)
Recorded Time and Other Stories (An Adventure related by the Characters the 6th Doctor & Peri) (2011)
Beyond the Ultimate Adventure (An Adventure related by the Character the 6th Doctor) (2011)
The Curse of Davros (An Adventure related by the Characters the 6th Doctor & Flip Jackson) (2012)
The Fourth Wall (An Adventure related by the Characters the 6th Doctor & Flip) (2012)
Wirrn Isle (An Adventure related by the Characters the 6th Doctor & Flip) (2012)
The Guardians of Prophercy (An Adventure related by the Characters the 6th Doctor & Peri) (2012)
Power Play (An Adventure related by the Characters the 6th Doctor, Peri & Victoria Waterfield) (2012)
The First Sontarans (An Adventure related by the Characters the 6th Doctor & Peri) (2012)
Voyage to Venus (An Adventure related by the Characters the 6th Doctor, Jago & Litefoot) (2012)
The Acheron Pulse (An Adventure related by the Character the 6th Doctor) (2012)
Voyage to the New World (An Adventure related by the Characters the 6th Doctor, Jago & Litefoot) (2012)
The Wrong Doctors (An Adventure related by the Characters the 6th Doctor & Mel) (2013)
Spaceport Fear (An Adventure related by the Characters the 6th Doctor & Mel) (2013)
The Seeds of War (An Adventure related by the Characters the 6th Doctor & Mel) (2013)
Trouble in Paradise (An Adventure related by the Character Peri) (2013)
The Light of the End (An Adventure related by the Characters the 6th Doctor & Peri) (2013)
1963: The Space Race (An Adventure related by the Characters the 6th Doctor & Peri) (2013)
Antidote to Olivion (An Adventure related by the Characters the 6th Doctor & Flip) (2014)
The Brood of Erys (An Adventure related by the Characters the 6th Doctor & Flip) (2014)
Scavenger (An Adventure related by the Characters the 6th Doctor & Flip) (2014)
Breaking Bubbles and Other Stories (An Adventure related by the Characters the 6th Doctor & Peri) (2014)
The Worlds of Doctor Who (An Adventure related by the Characters the 6th Doctor & Peri) (2014)
The Widow's Assassin (An Adventure related by the Characters the 6th Doctor & Peri) (2014)
Masters of Earth (An Adventure related by the Characters the 6th Doctor & Peri) (2014)
The Rani Elite (An Adventure related by the Characters the 6th Doctor & Peri) (2014)
Trial of the Valeyard (An Adventure related by the Character the 6th Doctor) (2014)
Last of the Cybermen (An Adventure related by the Character the 6th Doctor, Jamie & Zoe) (2015)
The Sixth Doctor: The Last Adventure (2015)
The End of the Line (An Adventure related by the Characters the 6th Doctor & Connstance Clarke) (2015)
The Red House (An Adventure related by the Characters the 6th Doctor & Charley) (2015)
Stage Fright (An Adventure related by the Characters the 6th Doctor & Flip) (2015)
The Brink of Death (An Adventure related by the Characters the 6th Doctor & Mel) (2015)
Criss-Cross (An Adventure related by the Characters the 6th Doctor & Constance) (2015)
Planet of the Rani (An Adventure related by the Characters the 6th Doctor & Constance) (2015)
Shield of the Jotunn (An Adventure related by the Characters the 6th Doctor & Constance) (2015)
Vampire of the Mind (An Adventure related by the Character the 6th Doctor) (2016)
Judoon in Chains (An Adventure related by the Character the 6th Doctor) (2016)
Order of the Daleks (An Adventure related by the Characters the 6th Doctor & Constance) (2016)
Absolute Power (An Adventure related by the Characters the 6th Doctor & Constance) (2016)
Quicksilver (An Adventure related by the Characters the 6th Doctor, Constance & Flip) (2016)
Vortex Ice/Cortex Fire (An Adventure related by the Characters the 6th Doctor & Flip) (2017)
The Carrionite Curse (An Adventure related by the character the 6th Doctor (2017)
The Behemoth (An Adventure related by the Characters the 6th Doctor, Constance & Flip) (2017)
The Middle (An Adventure related by the Characters the 6th Doctor, Constance & Flip) (2017)
Static (An Adventure related by the Characters the 6th Doctor, Constance & Flip) (2017)

Short Trips audios
The Wings of a Butterfly
The Doctor's Coat
Seven to One
Murmurs of Earth
To Cut a Blade of Grass

See also

 History of Doctor Who – Sixth Doctor

References

Bibliography

External links

 The Sixth Doctor on the BBC's Doctor Who website
 Sixth Doctor Gallery
 Sixth Doctor's first season theme music  QuickTime file
 Trial of a Time Lord theme music  QuickTime file
 Sixth Doctor first title sequence
 Sixth Doctor second title sequence

06
06
Male characters in television
Television characters introduced in 1984